Richard Taswell Richardson (1852–1930) was a British tennis player in the early years of Wimbledon.

Tennis career
Richardson's tennis career was brief but successful. He won the important Northern Championships three times in 1880, 1881 and 1882 (beating Ernest Renshaw in 1882). At the Wimbledon Championships in 1880, Richardson lost to Herbert Lawford in five sets in round three. 

In May 1881 he was defeated by Herbert Lawford again in the final of the Irish Lawn Tennis Championships in Dublin (at the time considered as prestigious a title to win as Wimbledon).  

In June 1881 he was a finalist at the Waterloo LTC Tournament in Liverpool, on 18 June he also won the  inaugural  Liverpool Cricket Club Lawn Tennis Tournament against Reginald Herbert Jones. In July 1881 at the Wimbledon Championship's he beat Ernest Renshaw in the final play off before losing to William Renshaw in the All comer's final at Wimbledon. 

At Wimbledon Championship's in 1882 Richardson beat Otway Woodhouse before losing to Ernest Renshaw in the All comer's final. At Wimbledon 1883 he lost his first match to Charles Grinstead and didn't play the tournament again.  Richardson was also a fine cricketer.  He played 5 matches for the MCC from 1876-1877. 

He played his last career tournament at Waterloo in Liverpool in June 1884 losing to Donald Stewart in four sets in the semi finals.

Grand Slam finals

Singles (2 runners-up)

Singles titles and finals
Note: (L) denotes Liverpool as location (M) Manchester tournament alternated till 1929

Cricket
Richardson also played first-class cricket for the Marylebone Cricket Club in 1876 and 1877, making five appearances. He scored 160 runs in these five matches, averaging 22.85 and with a high score of 48.

Personal
He was the son of Richard Richardson of Broughton, Hampshire. He graduated B.A. at University College, Oxford in 1876; and 1879 he was called to the bar at the Inner Temple. He was a Justice of the Peace.

References

Sources
 Nauright, John; Parrish, Charles (2012). Sports Around the World: History, Culture, and Practice. ABC-CLIO. .

1852 births
1930 deaths
People educated at Marlborough College
Alumni of University College, Oxford
English cricketers
Marylebone Cricket Club cricketers
19th-century male tennis players
People from Hampshire (before 1974)
English male tennis players
British male tennis players
Tennis people from Hampshire